The 1991–92 Alpha Ethniki was the 56th season of the highest football league of Greece. The season began on 1 September 1991 and ended on 7 June 1992. AEK Athens won their ninth Greek title and their first one in three years.

The point system was: Win: 2 points - Draw: 1 point.

Teams

Stadia and personnel

 1 On final match day of the season, played on 7 June 1992.

League table

Results

Top scorers

External links
Official Greek FA Site
RSSSF
Greek SuperLeague official Site
SuperLeague Statistics
 

Alpha Ethniki seasons
Greece
1